State Highway 89 (SH 89) is a  state highway in the rural eastern plains of Colorado. SH 89's southern terminus is at SH 116 at Buckeye Crossroads, and the northern terminus is at U.S. Route 50 (US 50) and US 400 in Holly.

Route description
 SH 89 begins in the north at the junction with US 50/400 in Holly and proceeds south out of Holly through rural countryside, isolated from any other towns. Although the highway is the main route from the unincorporated town of Lycan to Holly, there are no major junctions. The highway comes to a stop at the intersection with SH 116 at the small community of Buckeye Crossroads (population: 7). The road continues as an unpaved county road further south after the intersection.

Major intersections

References

External links

089
Transportation in Baca County, Colorado
Transportation in Prowers County, Colorado